Robert Tench (born 21 September 1944) is a British vocalist, guitarist, sideman, songwriter and arranger.

Tench is best known for his work with Freddie King and Van Morrison, as well as being a member of The Jeff Beck Group, Humble Pie, Streetwalkers and Van Morrison band. He is also associated with Hummingbird and Gass, as a founding member.

At the start of his career he performed and recorded with The Gass and also appeared with Gonzalez, before joining the Jeff Beck Group. He recorded with Ginger Baker before touring with Beck, Bogert & Appice as vocalist and recording sessions with Linda Lewis. Associations with Wailer Junior Marvin and the blues, rock guitarist Freddie King followed.

He signed to A&M Records and formed Hummingbird, later joining Roger Chapman and Charlie Whitney in Streetwalkers. During this period he had brief associations with Boxer and Widowmaker, recording album tracks with each before working with Van Morrison. When his commitments with Morrison came to an end he moved on to work and record with Eric Burdon also Axis Point, before Steve Marriott included him as an official band member in a new lineup of Humble Pie. Other collaborations and associations followed.

The Gass and early career 
Tench formed The Gass with Godfrey and Errol McLean in May 1965, credited as Robert Tench and during his time with the band featured as vocalist, guitarist and bass player. The band played mainly in the London Club circuit appearing at West End venues such as Rasputin's, The Bag O'Nails,The Speakeasy Club, The Flamingo Club (also known as The Pink Flamingo), Sibyllas  and Revolution. They also made other appearances elsewhere in the U.K with occasional tours in Europe.

The Gass were often accompanied on stage by guest musicians such as Georgie Fame,Jimi Hendrix and Eric Burdon. They recorded two singles for Parlophone and another for CBS with their original lineup, before taking a more progressive musical direction. During 1968 they were supporting bands such as Led Zeppelin. Tench moved on with drummer Godfrey McLean to form a new lineup and were signed by Polydor Records in 1969. By now the band was simply known as Gass and were already playing as the backing band for Catch My Soul, a stage musical produced by Jack Good. Tench sang some parts for Othello and he featured with the band on the original UK cast recording of Catch My Soul-Rock Othello, released a year later. They recorded Juju (1970), which was soon removed from retail outlets and re-released as Gass. Juju featured the Fleetwood Mac guitarist Peter Green on the tracks "Juju" and "Black Velvet".

Tench also formed the original lineup of Gonzalez with Godfrey McLean. The lineup also included Gass bandmates bassist Delisle Harper, percussionist Lennox Langton and sax player Mick Eve. During this period Tench began to use the pseudonym 'Bobby Gass'.

The Jeff Beck Group 
Tench moved on at the end of May 1971, leaving Gass and Gonzalez to become a member of The Jeff Beck Group. Jeff Beck had signed a record deal with CBS in June 1971, having reformed The Jeff Beck Group. Vocals by Alex Ligertwood had been unexpectedly rejected by record company bosses, forcing Beck to find a replacement singer. Having heard Tench perform with Gass, "Upstairs" at Ronnie Scott's club in Soho London, Beck employed him as replacement vocalist. In their book about Beck, Chris Hjort and Doug Hinman mention this association and circumstances. He was given only a short time to add his vocals to Rough and Ready (1971), before mixing resumed on tracks previously recorded in London by Beck and the other band members including, drummer Cozy Powell, bassist Clive Chaman and keyboard player Max Middleton. When the album was released in Europe they toured Finland, the Netherlands, Switzerland and Germany. Rough and Ready was released in USA eight months later and a sixteen date promotional tour followed. The album eventually reached No. 46 on the US album charts. Of Tench Rolling stone magazine stated: "...then comes Situation a long, well-played evocation of that misnamed hybrid jazz-rock and a neat rocker called Short Business. Vocalist Tench does a valiant job on both considering the considerable handicap of being mixed down under the guitar."

In January 1972 The Jeff Beck Group travelled to United States to join Beck at TMI studios in Memphis, Tennessee, where they recorded the album Jeff Beck Group (1972) with Steve Cropper as producer. The promotional tour which followed included an appearance on the BBC In Concert series, which was recorded on 29 June 1972 at the Paris Theatre, London. During this session Tench's guitar playing was featured on "Definitely Maybe", a rare occasion whilst he was associated with Beck. On 24 July 1972, the second Jeff Beck Group was officially disbanded and Beck's management released this statement: "The fusion of the musical styles of the various members has been successful within the terms of individual musicians, but they didn't feel it had led to the creation of a new musical style with the strength they had originally sought".

Ginger Baker, BBA and Freddie King 
In 1971 Tench played guitar with Cream's drummer Ginger Baker, studio sessions were recorded and released on the album Stratavarious in July 1972. He was credited under the pseudonym Bobby Gass and appeared with Afro beat innovator Fela Ransome-Kuti, also appearing at live dates with Baker during this period. Tracks from Stratavarious were later re-issued, along with others on Do What You Like.

He was re-united with Jeff Beck during the summer of 1972. At that time Beck was collaborating with bassist Tim Bogert and drummer Carmine Appice and they had begun touring the United States on 1 August 1972, billed as The Jeff Beck Group. Tench was flown in from England to replace vocalist Kim Milford, who left after the Arie Crown concert in Chicago, on 8 August. The tour concluded at the Paramount Theatre in Seattle, on 19 August 1972 and Tench ended his association with Jeff Beck further to the formation of the power trio Beck, Bogert & Appice.

Tench recorded with the blues rock guitarist Freddie King and record producer Mike Vernon. He is credited on two albums by King, Burglar (1974) and Larger than life (1975). King died of a heart attack on 29 December 1976 aged 42 and the compilation album Freddie King 1934–1976  was released several months later, featuring tracks Tench had contributed to on Burglar.

Linda Lewis and Junior Marvin's Hanson 
He featured as guitarist on Fathoms Deep (1973), an album by Linda Lewis which followed her top twenty success with "Rock a Doodle Do" in the UK singles charts. He appeared alongside former Jeff Beck Group keyboardist Max Middleton, bassist Phil Chen and guitarist Jim Cregan who also produced the album. In her review of Fathoms Deep for Allmusic, Amy Hanson wrote: "Helmed by a virtual supergroup featuring the likes of R&B masters Bobby Tench, Max Middleton, Danny Thompson and rocker Philip Chen, alongside Jim Cregan, Fathoms Deep is a true singer songwriter's album, tasteful and tight".

During February 1973 he went into the studio with Junior Marvin, who had appeared with Tench on the Gass album Juju three years previously (credited as Junior Kerr), Marvin had previously formed Hanson also known as "Junior Marvin's Hanson" and recorded tracks for Now Hear This (1973). The lineup on this album included drummer Conrad Isidore, bassist Clive Chaman who later joined Tench in Hummingbird and DeLisle Harper who also played bass and had been a member of Gass with Tench. The album fused rock with funk and was produced by Mario Medious also known as "Big M".

A&M records, Hummingbird and Streetwalkers 
Tench signed to A&M in 1973 and later formed the rock and soul fusion band Hummingbird, whose lineup included members of the second Jeff Beck Group also a second guitarist Bernie Holland and drummer Conrad Isidore. They recorded the first of three albums produced by Sammy Samwell entitled Hummingbird in 1975. Jeff Beck recorded several tracks with the band which were not released and he also made a live appearance with them at the Marquee Club in London.

In April 1975 he became a member of the Streetwalkers. He had already been part of a fluid line-up with Chapman and Whitney, performing as a member of "Chapman Whitney Streetwalkers" and appeared with their touring band at concerts such as at Hyde Park in London the previous year, He also appeared in television appearances with the band including Rockpalast in March 1975. Tench and Streetwalkers recorded their first album Downtown Flyers early in 1975, which was released during October the same year in Europe and the U.S.A. They then recorded a second album, the groove heavy Red Card (1976), which became their most respected album. On 8 June 1976 he appeared on the BBC Radio 1 Peel Sessions with Streetwalkers and they performed again on the John Peel sessions, on 14 March 1977.

He recorded a second album with Hummingbird We Can't Go On Meeting Like This, which was released in 1976 and became the first of two albums to feature drummer Bernard "Pretty" Purdie. Tench also recorded at this time with Mott the Hoople and Spooky Tooth guitarist Luther Grosvenor's band Widowmaker (UK) which was considered as a potential supergroup formed during 1975 and he contributed guitar and vocals to the band's first album Widowmaker (1976) which was recorded in 1975

During 1976 Tench also contributed to Bloodletting by Boxer, a band which had been formed by Mike Patto and Ollie Halsall also during 1975. This was recorded at The Manor Studios in Oxfordshire and would eventually be released as the band's third album three years later. He also appeared on stage with members of Boxer at the Crystal Palace Bowl on 7 August the same year, at a concert promoted by Harvey Goldsmith. This high pedigree concert also featured others such as Eric Clapton and Freddie King, who appeared with guests Larry Coryell and Ronnie Wood on the same bill. On 19 April 1977, Streetwalkers appeared on Rockpalast, for a final time and their set for this performance included Tench playing guitar and singing on songs such as "Run for Cover". Streetwalkers recorded their third and last studio album Vicious but fair (1977) with Tench and he also appeared on their final release Live Streetwalkers (1977) before the band broke up. Tench and Hummingbird's final album Diamond Nights was released the same year.

Van Morrison and Wavelength 
Van Morrison included Tench in a new band lineup as the lead guitarist and a vocalist in March 1978, to record the Wavelength album. Tench was recommended to Morrison by drummer Peter Van Hooke, after Hooke had seen him perform with Streetwalkers. In an interview with Johnny Rogan Tench stated: "I quite liked the songs "Natalia" and "Wavelength" because I had a lot to do with them. They came together quickly. He's a very quick worker and once it's there he doesn't see why you can't record it. He let us get on with it, really. It was a good band". He was credited with production assistance, guitar and backing vocals on this album, which became Morrison's best selling album at that time. He also contributed lead guitar and vocals to the promotional Wavelength tour which followed. The tour started in Santa Clara, California on 30 September 1978 and ended on 1 March 1979 in Newcastle upon Tyne, England. By the end of the tour he had appeared in Morrison's lineup sixty two times.

One of these appearances with Morrison was recorded and broadcast by WNEW-FM radio on 1 November 1978 at the Bottom Line in New York. and in his book Van Morrison: The Mystic Music, Howard. A. DeWitt described this concert as the "best live Van Morrison concert broadcast over radio". Later that year, on 26 November 1978 Morrison appeared with the same band at the Roxy in Los Angeles, U.S.A. This performance was recorded and released as the promotional album Live at the Roxy (1979).

Tench also appeared in the video Van Morrison in Ireland, which was filmed in February 1979, when he was performing with Morrison on "The Wavelength Tour" and was released in 1981. Of the band's performance on the video, Tony Stewart commented in NME, that: "The band display a range of textures reminiscent of The Caledonia Soul Orchestra, first with the dark resonance of Toni Marcus' violin, then Pat Kyle's bright sharp tenor sax and finally Bobby Tench's prickly electric guitar". In a review of the same video in January 2013, Rovi Eleanor Mannikka mentions "the quality of the music" in her review for The New York Times.

Eric Burdon and Humble Pie 
During May 1978 Tench joined Eric Burdon to record the album Darkness Darkness, at Roundwood House in County Leix Ireland. The album was released nearly two years later. The album was recorded using Ronnie Lane's Mobile Studio and with a lineup also including guitarists Brian Robertson from Thin Lizzy and Henry McCullough recently departed from Wings, also Mick Weaver from Traffic. He performed with Burdon in concerts during this time, before joining Streetwalkers guitarist Charlie Whitney's band Axis Point as a guitarist and vocalist to record Axis Point (1979).

He joined Humble Pie in 1980 further to a previously aborted attempt to enlist him. The lineup included founder member, guitarist and vocalist Steve Marriott, their original drummer Jerry Shirley and American bassist Anthony "Sooty" Jones. They recorded and submitted "Fool For a Pretty Face" to record companies which Marriott had written with Shirley earlier. The song secured a recording contract with Atlantic subsidiary Atco in USA and Don Arden's Jet Records in U.K. Tench remained with them and they recorded On To Victory (1980), which reached No. 60 in the Billboard 200 album charts and the single  "Fool For a Pretty Face" reached No. 52 in the US singles charts. Tench toured with Humble Pie in United States as part of the Rock 'N' Roll Marathon Bill, which included others such as Aerosmith and they recorded Go for the Throat (1980). The band toured this album after its release During the tour, earlier scheduled appearances by the band were delayed and later Marriott became ill, forcing the cancellation of all further tour dates. Soon afterwards Humble Pie disbanded. Tench recorded "Chain Gang" in 1982 as a tribute to Sam Cooke, which was released as a single by the German label Line Records. "Looking for a Good Time" was featured on the B side, a song co-written by Tench and Peter Bardens.

Other associations 
He later recorded with Topper Headon the drummer from The Clash, credited on Headon's album Waking Up (1984). Tracks from these sessions and others such were used for promotional and commercial releases and some found Club success as well. The lineup included Headon, Tench, vocalist Jimmy Helms, former Ian Dury and the Blockheads and Clash keyboard player Mick Gallagher, also bassist Jerome Rimson.

During this period he appeared with bands such as Roger Chapman's Shortlist at Glastonbury in 1985, also appearing with them at various other European festivals. He recorded vocals for a cover of "Still in Love with You" (1986) for Stiff records, as a tribute to Phil Lynott who had died on 4 January the same year. The song was released as a single by the Stiff label, later the same year and Brian Robertson contributed guitar parts. The B side "Heart Out Of Love" was co-written by Jeremy Bird and Tench.

In 1993 Tench sang lead vocals with The Thin Lizzy band, which featured original Thin Lizzy drummer Brian Downey, former guitarist Brian Robertson, also Doish Nagle and bassist Dough Brookie. The band played a short tour of Ireland. Tench also played guitar and sang vocals with former Animals keyboardist Alan Price and The Electric Blues Company on Covers (1994). Later that year he recorded A Gigster's Life for Me with the same lineup. This album was recorded between July and August 1995 at Olympic Studios, London and released the next year as part of Sanctuary's Blues Masters Series. In his review for Allmusic, Thom Jurek hints at Tench's influence on the album and stated that "the Peter Barden's and Bobby Tench song Good Times, Bad Woman with its slippery guitars and keyboards feels more like Peter Green's mid-period work and the killer read of Boz Scagg's Some Change, is more driven and funky than the original. Then there's the reggae-blues of the title track, which swings out of a jazzy backbeat into a rootsier inner circle type groove".

During 1995 he contributed guitar and vocals to Rattlesnake Guitar a tribute to Peter Green (1995). He joined Paul Jones and Max Middleton on the song "Whatcha Gonna Do" and Zoot Money on the song "Albatross", the album was released in October of the same year. In 1998 he played guitar and contributed vocals on Ruby Turner's Call Me by My Name, appearing alongside Boz Burrell, Stan Webb and Zoot Money.

Humble Pie drummer Jerry Shirley reformed Humble Pie in U.K during 2000 with a lineup including former member Tench, their original bassist Greg Ridley and a new rhythm guitarist Dave "Bucket" Colwell. They recorded Back on Track, which was released by Sanctuary Records on 19 February 2002. A brief tour of U.K and Europe with Company of Snakes followed, but was curtailed due to Greg Ridley becoming ill. On 14 April 2001, Tench appeared as a guitarist and vocalist at the Steve Marriott Tribute Concert and performed the Humble Pie song "Fool for Pretty Face", which he had originally recorded with the band in 1980. He was also the front man for the house band which included Zak Starkey, Rabbit Bundrick and Rick Wills. Performances from this concert were released on various CDs, including Mustn't Grumble: Steve Marriott Memorial Concert 2001 and a DVD entitled The Steve Marriott Astoria Memorial Concert 2001 was eventually released on 5 October 2004.

Tench continued to be involved with studio collaborations and production and occasionally made appearances at live shows such as with Roger Chapman, Arthur Louis and Jim Cregan. In 2009 he was a featured artist in the Maximum Rhythm and Blues Tour of thirty two UK theatres. On 17 March 2015 he performed several songs at The Half Moon, Putney music venue in London, at a benefit concert for the former Wings guitarist Henry McCullough in a line up which included Paul Carrack and Nick Lowe. During the same concert Tench also performed with the backing band called Henry's Heroes, an appropriate pseudonym for Hinkley's Heroes. He has also appeared with Barnes Blues at the historic Bull's Head music venue in South West London.

Reputation 
Tench is a respected musician and for Allmusic Mark Deming states in his biography of him, that he is "a talented singer and guitarist who has worked with some of the biggest and best-respected names in British rock". In their book Chronology of Jeff Beck's Career 1965–1980, Chris Hjort and Doug Hinman mention that "Tench is a proficient guitar player" and in her review of The Linda Lewis album Fathoms Deep, Amy Hanson described him as a "R&B master".

When writing about Tench joining the Jeff Beck Group the author Martin Power makes reference to him stating that "he was a first class singer". On the original release of The Jeff Beck Group's album Rough and Ready, Stephen Davis of Rolling Stone magazine wrote "Then comes [the track] Situation and a neat rocker called Short Business. Vocalist Tench does a valiant job on both, considering the considerable handicap of being mixed down under the guitar. Tench has a fine, gravel voice and sometimes sounds like Felix Cavaliere. Trying to fill [Rod] Stewart's high heels is no mean feat and it's to Tench's credit that he carries himself well".

A Beat publication which featured an article about the band Hummingbird's album We can't go on meeting like this, noted that Tench's voice had "surprising power and range used to the full" and of the band in which Tench also played lead guitar, the music magazine Gramophone commented that "the members of Hummingbird are the cream of British session musicians, more acclimatised than most to playing rock at all intellectual levels".

In 2008 Doug Collett reviewed Van Morrison's re-mastered Wavelength album (2008) for the online magazine allabout jazz.com and mentioned Tench's guitar solo on the title track, stating that he "imbued his fast fingered guitar solo with all the joy of singing". Later rocktrain.net also commented on Tench's guitar solo on the same recording stating that "of particular note is the zinging, joyous lead guitar of Bobby Tench. His concise solo at mid-song is uplifting, bending notes every which way while displaying a special adeptness at speed noodling. It is truly pleasurable" and on the blog site "The Immortal Jukebox" Thom Hickey reflected on a live performance from the same period, noting that "Bobby Tench played gorgeous spiky guitar fills".

The Canadian rock band Danko Jones mention his vocals in their song "Sugar High" with the lyric "Got the radio on to Bob Tench singing Sugar Cane, from their album This is Danko Jones (2009). Fran Leslie wrote an editorial feature about Tench for the September 2009 edition of the Blues in Britain magazine. In her introduction she wrote "Our cover artist Bobby Tench is a musician who has played and recorded with so many people that his biography reads like a Who's Who of British Blues". She also stated that he was a noted singer and formidable guitarist.

In an interview with Tom Jennings from Backstage Axxess in 2012, Joe Bonamassa mentioned Tench as a vocal influence. Later, in a 2018 interview with Planet Rock magazine Bonamassa mentioned Tench's vocal skills and stated that he "had one of the best voices of the 1970s". In his 2016 autobiography Stick It, Carmine Appice (drummer for the influential Vanilla Fudge) states that Tench was "a killer soulful singer, with a real cool gritty edge to his vocals".

Discography

Singles 
As Bobby Tench

With Gass

With The Jeff Beck Group

With Hanson (Junior Marvin)

With Freddie King

With Streetwalkers

With Hummingbird

With Boxer

With Widowmaker (U.K)

With Van Morrison

With Humble Pie

With Topper Headon

With Jeff Beck

Albums

DVD and video 
Van Morrison: Van Morrison in Ireland. Video (1981)
Steve Marriott: Astoria Memorial Concert 2001. DVD (2004)
Streetwalkers: Live at Rockpalast DVD (2013)

Notes

References

Baker, Ginger and Ginette.Hellraiser: The Autobiography of the World's Greatest Drummer, John Blake Publishing (2009). 
Bogdanov, Bush, Woodstra, Erlewine. Allmusic guide to soul: the definitive guide to R&B and soul. Backbeat (2003). 
Carson, Annette. Jeff Beck: Crazy Fingers. Backbeat (2001). 
Burdon, Eric and Marshall Craig, Jeff. Don't Let Me Be Misunderstood, Perseus Books Group (2002). 
Celmins, Martin. Peter Green Founder of Fleetwood Mac, foreword by BB King. Sanctuary Publishing, (1998) 2nd edition. 
Collis, John. Van Morrison: Inarticulate Speech of the Heart. Da Capo Press. (1996). 
Frame, Pete. Rock Family Trees. Omnibus Press (March 1993) 
Graff, Gary. Music Hound Rock: The Essential Guide. Visible Ink Press, (1999). Cat no MH10008.
Brock, Helander. The Rock Who's Who. Schirmer Books, (1996). 2nd edition. 
Hewitt, Paulo and Hellier, John. Steve Marriott – All Too Beautiful... Helter Skelter, (2004). 
Hjort, Chris and Hinman, Doug. Jeff's book : A Chronology of Jeff Beck's Career 1965–1980 : From the Yardbirds to Jazz-Rock. Rock 'n' Roll Research Press, (2000). 
Jasper, Tony and Oliver, Derek. The International Encyclopedia of Hard Rock & Heavy metal. Facts on File (1985). Digitized (30 August 2007). 
Joynson, Vernon. The Tapestry of Delights – The Comprehensive Guide to British Music of the Beat, R&B, Psychedelic and Progressive Eras 1963–1976. Borderline (2006). Reprinted (2008). 
Larkin, Colin. The Guinness Encyclopedia of Popular Music. Guinness (1992). Item notes ver 2. Digitized (19 Jun 2007). 
Madsen, Pete. Funk Guitar And Bass: Know the Players, Play the Music. Backbeat (2007). 
Muise, Dan. Gallagher, Marriott, Derringer & Trower: Their lives and music. Hal Leonard Corporation (2002). 
Putterford, Mark. Phil Lynott the Rocker. Omnibus Press (11 March 2002). 
Rees, Dafydd and Rampton, Luke. Rock Movers & Shakers. ABC-CLIO (1991) revised. Original from the University of Michigan. Digitized (29 December 2006). 
Rogan, Johnny. Van Morrison: No Surrender. Vintage Books. (2006). 
Roberts, David. British Hit Singles & Albums 19th edition. London: Guinness World Records Limited, (2006). 
Ruppli, Michel and the Atlantic Recording Corporation. Atlantic Records: A discography. Greenwood Press, (1979). Item notes ver 3. Digitized (29 August 2007) 
Rusch, Bob. Cadence. B. Rusch (1996). Item notes ver 22. Digitized (28 July 2008)
Strong, Martin Charles and Peel, John. The Great Rock Discography. Canongate US (2004). 7th edition. 
York, William. Who's Who in Rock Music. Atomic Press (1978). Original from the University of Michigan. Digitized (30 August 2007).

External links

 

British rock singers
British rock guitarists
British male guitarists
Humble Pie (band) members
Lead guitarists
Living people
The Jeff Beck Group members
Hummingbird (band) members
1944 births
Gonzalez (band) members
Streetwalkers members